Two ships have been known as SMS Cormoran:

, an unprotected cruiser built by the German Kaiserliche Marine
, a Russian transport ship captured by the German raider  and commissioned as an auxiliary cruiser during World War I

German Navy ship names